Shelgaon, commonly known as "Shelgaon Hatkar" is a village located in Sonpeth taluka of Parbhani district, in state of Maharashtra.

Demographics
As per 2011 census:
Shelgaon Hatkar has 670 families residing. The village has population of 3282.
Out of the population of 2744, 1386 are males while 1358 are females.
Literacy rate of the village is 67.05%.
Average sex ratio of the village is 980 females to 1000 males. Average sex ratio of Maharashtra state is 929.

Geography, and transport

References

Villages in Parbhani district